Jammapur is a village in Yadadri Bhuvanagiri district of Telangana, India. It falls under Bhongir mandal.

Jammapur actual name is Gemmapur was named by Italian Priest in remembrance of saint Gemma Galgani and 100% Roman Catholics. People of Gemmapuram completely rely on Agriculture and farming. Largest catholic village in Yadadri District.

References

Villages in Yadadri Bhuvanagiri district